Carol Michelle Walker  (born 17 December 1952) is an English professional golfer.

Life
Walker was born in Leeds, Yorkshire, England. She won the Hovis International in 1972. She turned professional in 1973 and played on the U.S.-based LPGA Tour from 1974 to 1981. Her best finish was a T-2 at the 1976 Jerry Lewis Muscular Dystrophy Classic where she lost a four-player playoff to Sandra Palmer.

Walker was a founding member of the Ladies European Tour and won six times on the tour between 1979 and 1984.

Walker was Europe's Solheim Cup captain the first four times the Cup was held (1990, 1992, 1994 and 1996), captaining Europe to its first victory in the competition in 1992. She coached the Great Britain & Ireland Curtis Cup team in 1994, 1996 and 1998. She has been appointed captain of the 2019 European team for the Junior Solheim Cup at Gleneagles.

Walker was head professional at the Warren Golf Club in Essex from 1986 to 2001. In the 1993 Birthday Honours list she was appointed an Officer of the Order of the British Empire for services to Women's Golf.

She works as a golf coach, radio and television commentator and public speaker.

Professional wins (6)

Ladies European Tour wins (6)
1979 Carlsberg Championship – York
1980 Lambert & Butler Matchplay
1981 Carlsberg Championship – St Pierre
1983 Sands International
1984 Baume & Mercier International, Lorne Stewart Matchplay Championship

Team appearances
Amateur
European Ladies' Team Championship (representing England): 1971 (winners), 1973 (winners)
Vagliano Trophy (representing Great Britain & Ireland): 1971 (winners)
Curtis Cup (representing Great Britain & Ireland): 1972
Commonwealth Trophy (representing Great Britain): 1971 (winners)

References

External links

English female golfers
LPGA Tour golfers
Ladies European Tour golfers
Winners of ladies' major amateur golf championships
Officers of the Order of the British Empire
Sportspeople from Leeds
1952 births
Living people